Marshall Jewel Reed (May 28, 1917 – April 15, 1980) was an American actor who appeared in over 200 films between 1943 and 1978. He was born in Englewood, Colorado.

Early years
Reed's parents were Walter George Reed and Ruth Dustin. By age 10, he was acting in children's theater, and he managed two drama groups while he was in high school. Before becoming a professional actor, "he held various odd jobs such as horse trainer, meter reader, bookkeeper, and mail clerk."

Stage
Summer stock theatre at Elitch Gardens in Denver, Colorado, provided Reed's first professional experience with acting. Besides appearing in plays there, he made costumes and constructed scenery. Later he worked with other theatrical groups in the Denver area, writing and producing as well as acting. Still later, he had his own stock company on the West Coast and acted in summer stock in New York and Los Angeles.

Film
Reed started his cinema career in Bordertown Gun Fighters, a 1943 western starring Wild Bill Elliott. (Another source says, "He made his screen debut in Silver Spurs (1943).")
 
An athletic stuntman, Reed handled much of his own fighting and riding. Over the years, he did dozens of westerns and cliffhanger serials for Columbia and Republic studios, in which he was usually cast as action heavies.  He appeared in a rare sympathetic role as Buffalo Bill Cody in the 1954 serial Riding with Buffalo Bill.

Television
Between the 1950s and 1970s, Reed was a familiar face in popular TV series, particularly in the action and drama genres.

In 1960, he appeared twice on Gene Barry's TV Western series Bat Masterson, once playing the "good guy" as stage coach driver and posse member "Alf Hayman" in S2E22's "The Snare", and another time playing the "bad guy" as a murdering outlaw named "Romer" in S3E7's "High Card Loses".

He also played Inspector Fred Asher in The Lineup. In 1978 he costarred in Till Death, his last film appearance.

Death
Reed "died of a massive hemorrhage following a brain tumor" April 15, 1980, in Los Angeles, California, at the age of 62. Survivors included his fifth wife, Carlyn Miller, and a daughter.

Selected appearances

Films

 Law Men (1944)
 The Tiger Woman (1944, Serial)
 Haunted Harbor (1944, Serial)
 Zorro's Black Whip (1944, Serial)
 Gun Smoke (1945)
 Gentleman Joe Palooka (1946)
Drifting Along  (1946)
 Angel and the Badman (1947)
 Prairie Express (1947)
 Raiders of the South (1947)
 Song of the Wasteland (1947)
 Stage to Mesa City (1947)
 Trailing Danger (1947)
 West of Dodge City (1947)
 Back Trail (1948)
 The Fighting Ranger (1948)
 The Bold Frontiersman (1948)
 Courtin' Trouble (1948)
 Dead Man's Gold (1948)
 Mark of the Lash (1948)
 Renegades of Sonora (1948)
 Triggerman (1948)
 Brand of Fear (1949)
 Stampede (1949)
 Gun Runner (1949)
 Ghost of Zorro (1949, Serial)
 Law of the West (1949)
 Pirates of the High Seas (1950, Serial)
 Hot Rod (1950)
 Stagecoach Driver (1951)
 Canyon Raiders (1951)
 The Longhorn (1951)
 Mysterious Island (1951, Serial)
 Night Raiders (1952)
 Montana Incident (1952)
 Kansas Territory (1952)
Laramie Mountains (1952)
 Son of Geronimo (1952, Serial)
 Blackhawk (1952, Serial)
 The Great Adventures of Captain Kidd (1953, Serial)
 Gunfighters of the Northwest (1954, Serial)
 Riding with Buffalo Bill (1954, Serial)
 The Night the World Exploded (1957)
 Fate Is the Hunter (1964)
 The Hallelujah Trail (1965)
 Till Death (1978)

TV shows

 The Marshal of Gunsight Pass (1950) – Larry Thomas
 The Gene Autry Show (1950–1954) – Tom Jenkins / Henchman Coley / First Miller Ranch Hand / Henchman in Denim Jacket / Tom Maraday / Ed, Henchman
 The Cisco Kid (1950–1955) – Dobie / Dick / Whit Jameson / Uncle Wilson Ford / Todd Wheeler / Fred / John Sterns / Henchman / Slade / Blade Meddick / Slick / Frank Tracy / Tom Tracy / Jim Tracy
 The Range Rider (1951–1953) – Hurley / Jud / Red / Ringo Massey aka Chad Walker / Blaze Barnett / Bank Robber / Deputy Charley
 The Adventures of Wild Bill Hickok (1951–1954) – Henchman Jim / DuBois / Targ
 Boston Blackie (1951–1953) – Slick – Henchman
 Hopalong Cassidy (1952–1953) – Rawhide Carney – Henchman / Bob Hayes
 The Adventures of Kit Carson (1952–1954) – Henchman Joe / Taggart Henchman / Henchman
 The Lone Ranger (1952–1955) – Deputy / Grenville aka Vail / Dix Manson
 Adventures of Superman (1953–1954) – Security Agent / Inspector Hill
 Annie Oakley (1954) – Ward / Al / Hired Killer
 The Lineup (1954–1959) – Inspector. Fred Asher
 Captain Midnight (1955) – Portman
 Commando Cody: Sky Marshal of the Universe (1955) – Bill
 Tightrope (1960) – Atkins
 Bat Masterson (1960) – (two appearances) as Alf Hayman /and as Romer
 Shirley Temple's Storybook (1960) – Black Arrow
 Lassie (1961) – Ranger Wes Wade
 Ripcord (1961) – Harvey
 Bonanza (1961–1962) – Party Guest / Hammond
 Lawman (1962) – Jake – Henchman
 Bronco (1962) – Marshal Hank Barton / Harrison
 Checkmate (1962) – Neighbor
 Maverick (1962) – Hatfield
 Gunsmoke (1962) – Sam Vestal
 Perry Mason (1962–1963) – Policeman / Fisherman / First Officer
 Laramie (1963) – Sgt. Nolan
 Death Valley Days (1969–1970) – Harold Graves III / Cal Hinshaw
 Marcus Welby, M.D. (1969–1973) – Matt Callan / Carter
 Dragnet (1969–1970) – Sgt. Norman Bivins / Sgt. Hughes / Fred Deemer / Officer Whitney / Lt. Phil Johnson
 Adam-12 (1970–1971) – Capt. Edwards / John Russell
 The Virginian (1971) – Doctor
 Kung Fu (1975) – Doorman

See also
List of film serials: 1910–1956
List of Western films: 1950-1954

References

External links

1917 births
1980 deaths
American male film actors
American male television actors
20th-century American male actors
Deaths from brain cancer in the United States
Deaths from cancer in California